Liu Xiaofeng (born 1956) is a contemporary Chinese scholar and a professor at Renmin University of China.  He has been considered the prototypical example of what is called a cultural Christian, meaning a believer who may lack a specific church identification or affiliation, and was, along with He Guanghu, one of the main forerunners of the academic field of Sino-Christian Theology.  However, in recent years, his interest has shifted from studies in Christian theology to the political theories of Leo Strauss and Carl Schmitt.

Biography 
Liu Xiaofeng was born in Chongqing, China, in April 1956.

He completed his Bachelor of Arts degree in German language and literature at Sichuan International Studies University before beginning his Master of Arts in aesthetics at Peking University in 1982, completing it in 1985. He later received a scholarship to study at the University of Basel in Switzerland in April 1989, where he completed his Ph.D in Christian theology in 1993 on a theological investigation into Max Scheler's phenomenology and critique of modernity.  He also undertook an extensive translation effort of historical and contemporary Christian texts.  A modern writer commented, "Liu's writings have had a major impact in China not only on those Chinese who think of themselves as Christian, but on those who are interested in broad analysis of China in the context of the world's current cultural and philosophical era." However, his interpretation of Strauss and other modern Western thinkers has been criticized as one-sided and even deeply flawed, with critics claiming that his defense of the Chinese Communist Party, and Mao Zedong in particular, does not go well together with Christianity, nor with Classical Western civilization as described by Strauss and his disciples 

He is a professor at the School of Liberal Arts, Renmin University of China

Writings 

 Liu, Xiaofeng (2015). Sino-Theology and the Philosophy of History : A Collection of Essays by Liu Xiaofeng. edited by Leopold Leeb. Leiden: Brill.

References 

1956 births
20th-century Chinese philosophers
21st-century Chinese philosophers
Conservatism in China
Educators from Chongqing
Chinese Christian theologians
People's Republic of China philosophers
Philosophers of art
Phenomenologists
Political philosophers
Living people
Academic staff of Renmin University of China
Philosophers from Chongqing
Date of birth missing (living people)
Political theologians